Philip Basset (c. 1185 – 19 October 1271) was the Justiciar of England.

Philip was the son of Alan Basset of High Wycombe in Buckinghamshire. His elder brothers were Gilbert, a baronial leader, and Fulk, who became bishop of London.

He inherited the manor of Wycombe; the town received market borough status in 1237.

Basset served as the Justiciar of England between the two terms served by his son-in-law, Hugh le Despencer, 1st Baron le Despencer. He served during the period that Henry III regained control of the government from the barons.

He was married twice. By Hawise, granddaughter of Godfrey of Louvain (d.1226), he had two daughters:
 Aline, who  married firstly Hugh le Despencer, 1st Baron le Despencer and secondly Roger Bigod, 5th Earl of Norfolk
 Margery, who married Sir John FitzJohn.

References

1180s births
1271 deaths
Justiciars of England
People from High Wycombe
Anglo-Normans
Feudal barons of Wycombe